Nicholas George Littlemore (born 6 May 1978) is an Australian musician, record producer, singer and songwriter. As a musician, he is the frontman of the electronic duo Pnau, an ex-member of the art-rock band Teenager and one part of the electro pop-project Empire of the Sun. As a record producer, he has worked with Elton John, Lover Lover, Groove Armada and Mika. From late 2009, Littlemore had worked with the Cirque Du Soleil as a composer and musical director for the touring arena show Zarkana, which debuted on 29 June 2011. His older brother Sam La More is also a musician and record producer. In 2019, he and Peter Mayes launched the label Lab78.

Biography

Littlemore was born on 6 May 1978 in Sydney and was raised in Wahroonga with his older brothers, James (later a music video director) and Sam Littlemore (born February 1975, later a musician and producer). In 2011 Littlemore recalled, "[m]y parents didn't push us but led us towards creative endeavours. Early on, my brothers and I were naturally interested in that. In school holidays we were doing pottery classes or life drawing. I wasn't very sporty". Their cousin, Xanthe Littlemore, is a singer-songwriter and has toured with Paul Kelly. When Littlemore was 10 years old, he met future bandmate Peter Mayes and the pair were making music together at the age of 13 or 14. Littlemore attended Barker College in Hornsby and finished secondary education in 1996. He attended the College of Fine Arts at the University of New South Wales studying film, sound and performance.
Littlemore and Mayes formed Pnau in the mid-1990s, initially as an acid house and trance band, while still at secondary school. The group have issued four studio albums, Sambanova (July 1999), Again (October 2003), Pnau (January 2007) and Soft Universe (July 2011). Sambanova, Pnau and Soft Universe have each peaked into the ARIA Albums Chart Top 40.

While still a member of Pnau, Littlemore has also been involved in side-projects. In 2001 he joined his brother Sam in the group L'More and issued a single, "Takin' Hold". Sam subsequently performed as Sam La More, in April 2003 "Takin' Hold" was released in the United Kingdom. In 2004 Littlemore formed Teenager as an art rock band in Sydney and asked Pip Brown (aka Ladyhawke) to join on guitar. Brown had relocated to Australia after the disbandment of her New Zealand hard rock group, Two Lane Blacktop. Teenager issued Thirteen and the related single "Bound and Gagged" in 2006. Littlemore's brother James directed the music video for "Bound and Gagged". Mess + Noises Craig Mathieson described the album as "a pop record, albeit a particularly exotic species that equally suggests creative guile and hints of self-indulgence ... 'Pony' is the closest the album comes to cheap genre holidaying, approximating rock attitude when the organic and desperate growth of 'Bound And Gagged' is so much more impressive". Soon after the album's appearance Brown left to concentrate on her solo career (i.e. Ladyhawke) and she later credited Littlemore:

In 2000, Littlemore met Luke Steele of alternate rockers The Sleepy Jackson, the pair subsequently collaborated on songwriting and performing. The Sleepy Jackson's recorded "Tell the Girls That I'm Not Hangin' Out" for their debut album, Lovers (2003). It had been co-written by Littlemore, Steele and The Sleepy Jackson's Malcolm Clark. The Sleepy Jackson and Pnau both performed "Modern Way", which was written by Littlemore, Mayes and Steele. In 2007 Pnau issued their self-titled album with Steele supplying lead vocals, and co-writing with Littlemore and Mayes, on "Freedom" and "With You Forever". Ladyhawke supplied lead vocals on "Embrace" which was co-written by Brown, Littlemore, Mayes and La More.

While working together on Pnau, Littlemore and Steele started writing tracks for a side project, initially called Steelemore, which became the electro pop group Empire of the Sun. Littlemore was living in Sydney and Steele, then in Perth, however the pair corresponded and continued composing together. Periodically during 2007, Steele would fly to Sydney where tracks were recorded for Empire of the Sun's debut album, Walking on a Dream. Mayes assisted with recording and mixing.

To promote Pnau internationally, Littlemore and Mayes travelled to London. In December 2007 Elton John heard Pnau's "Wild Strawberries" – the lead single from the album – while in Sydney for the Australian leg of his Rocket Man Tour. After hearing the whole album John contacted Littlemore to encourage him. Pnau returned to Australia in January 2008 to perform at Big Day Out and met John who signed the duo with his United Kingdom-based management. Pnau then relocated to London more permanently, both Littlemore and Mayes worked with John. Littlemore and Mayes established a recording studio in London and worked as record producers.

In August 2008, Empire of the Sun issued their debut single, "Walking on a Dream", which peaked at No. 10 on the ARIA Singles Chart. The second single, "We Are the People", followed in September with the parent album released in October. The album reached No. 6 on the ARIA Albums Chart. In February 2009, Littlemore told Linda McGee of Raidió Teilifís Éireann (RTÉ) that Empire of the Sun planned to tour in August but not as a group "this is not a band project. We're not going to stand up there with guitar, bass, drums and a keyboard player and just play our songs out in a merry Indie kind of way". He described a more theatrical presentation, "I've just finished the first draft of the script and it's going to be more of a play, for want of a better term. So at the moment we've got people working in China building inflatable sets and all kinds of things and we're working with some theatre directors in London". However, from April to September that year, Steele could not contact Littlemore. From September Empire of the Sun, without Littlemore, performed live tours of Australia.

Littlemore's bands have won eight ARIA Music Awards, with one in 2000 for 'Best Dance Release' for Pnau's Sambanova, and seven in 2009 for Empire of the Sun's album Walking on a Dream and the title song. Empire of the Sun – without Littlemore – performed "Walking on a Dream" at the ceremony with Steele collecting the awards on the band's behalf, he quipped "German Shepard Steele gets another award ... Everybody say hi to invisible Nick!". Ladyhawke also won two awards for her solo work.

Since 2009 Littlemore has received medication to treat arthritis. From late 2009 Littlemore worked in Montreal, Canada with the Cirque Du Soleil as a composer and musical director for the touring arena show, Zarkana, which debuted on 29 June 2011 in New York. Pnau's fourth album, Soft Universe, was recorded in London. Upon its release Mayes confirmed Littlemore and Steele were working on a second Empire of the Sun album. Littlemore expanded, "We just started writing two or three weeks ago in New York ... Luke and I got into a studio, which was run by blind people – it was great. It's good to be in weird places with Luke, we enjoy that. He has an extraordinary mind – it's sounding so good". As from July 2011, when not touring or performing, he lives in LA. During late 2011 Pnau toured through Australia promoting their album.

Discography
With Pnau

with Teenager

With Empire of the Sun

With L'More
"Takin' Hold" (2001)

As Vlossom

Extended plays

Singles

As lead artist

Production work
Nick Littlemore is credited with the following work for other artists:
 David Bridie – Hotel Radio (18 February 2003) producer, loops, noise, programming
 Robbie Williams – Greatest Hits (18 October 2004) programming
 Van She – Van She (27 November 2005) producer, composer
 Darren Emerson – "Bouncer" (2005), "Hard 4 Slow" (2007), Au Go Go (EP, 8 August 2011) co-producer, co-writer
 Lost Valentinos – Damn & Damn Again (2006) co-producer
 Mercy Arms – Kept Low (EP, 2006) co-producer
 Groove Armada – Black Light (2010) vocals, composer
 Groove Armada – White Light (18 October 2010) vocals, composer
 WZRD – WZRD (28 February 2012) sound design
 Mika – The Origin of Love (16 September 2012) songwriting credits, production

Awards and nominations

APRA Awards
The APRA Awards are presented annually from 1982 by the Australasian Performing Right Association (APRA).

|-
| rowspan="3" | 2010 || "We Are the People" || Song of the Year || 
|-
| Luke Steele, Jonathon Sloan, Nick Littlemore – Empire of the Sun || Breakthrough Songwriter of the Year || 
|-
| "Walking on a Dream" || Dance Work of the Year || 
|-
| rowspan="2" | 2014 
| rowspan="2" | "Alive" 
| Song of the Year
| 
|-
| Dance Work of the Year
|

ARIA Music Awards
The ARIA Music Awards is an annual awards ceremony that recognises excellence, innovation, and achievement across all genres of Australian music. They commenced in 1987. 

! 
|-
| ARIA Music Awards of 2020
| Imogen Grist & Nick Littlemore for Pnau featuring Vlossom – "Lucky"
| Best Video
| 
| 
|-

References

External links

 Nick Littlemore photo at National Library of Australia

          

1978 births
Living people
APRA Award winners
Australian electronic musicians
Australian expatriates in the United States
Australian indie pop musicians
Australian indie rock musicians
Australian record producers
Musicians from Sydney
People educated at Barker College
University of New South Wales alumni
Empire of the Sun (band) members
Pnau members
Arts managers